Zhiyan Reservoir is a reservoir located in the town of Huangdian, Lanxi, Zhejiang, China. It belongs to the first grade water source protection area and is part of Lanxi's water supply network. It is adjacent to the city of Jiande.

History
Zhiyan Reservoir was built in April 1974 for irrigation, flood control, electricity generation and drinking water purposes.

References

Reservoirs in Zhejiang
Lanxi County
Tourist attractions in Jinhua
1970s establishments in China